Thought Catalog is a website founded in 2010 by American entrepreneur and media strategist Chris Lavergne. Owned by The Thought & Expression Company, the site attracts 25 million monthly unique visitors.

The site's founder, Chris Lavergne, registered the domain name in 2008, and began working on the site while a marketing strategist at Warner Bros. Records. Thought Catalog started publishing on February 1, 2010. By 2012, Thought Catalog was attracting 2.5 million unique visitors per month, and began to attract many millennial readers, with nearly three-quarters of the site's audience falling into the 21- to 34-year-old demographic.

The site is based on a semi-open model, employing staff and freelance writers while also taking submissions for publication. Thought Catalog receives between 100 and 500 pieces a day via the submission form.

In July 2014 Thought Catalog was drawing more than 34 million unique visitors per month, with much of the traffic due to social sharing.

Thought Catalog earns revenue from branded content and banner ads, with the Wall Street Journal featuring the site on its list of "Sponsored Content That Buzzed In 2014."

Thought Catalog’s founder, Chris Lavergne, was named to Forbes "30 Under 30" list in 2014.

Books 
Thought Catalog launched Thought Catalog Books with four original e-books priced from $2.99 to $4.99. As of June 2015, the imprint accepts manuscripts from their active contributors and from unaffiliated authors, some with agents, some without. They publish both eBooks and print books. In September 2014, Thought Catalog Books and UTA sold the rights to The Tracking of a Russian Spy, by Mitch Swenson, to StudioCanal. The imprint published Prozac Nation author Elizabeth Wurtzel’s book Creatocracy in early 2015.

Content

Thought Catalog’s content, which includes listicles, essays, and think pieces, has been noted for its "millennial" voice. Many well-known authors have contributed to the site including Simon Critchley, Elizabeth Wurtzel, Tao Lin, Nick Mullen, Robert Greene, James Altucher, Mélanie Berliet, Gavin McInnes and Tim Ferriss, in addition to previously unpublished essayists. These entailed co-publisher Brandon Scott Gorrell, conversational columnist Chelsea Fagan, technology and gaming writer Josh Liburdi, and Avery Hopwood Award-Winning Poet Jennifer Sussex. 

Early on, the site was known for publishing alternative literature, with Tao Lin as a regular contributor. Later, it became associated with a personal, confessional style. The ambiance between Fagan and Lin was particularly entertaining for fans, while Gorrell composed a majority of the more serious, lengthier essays. 

Others such as McInnes and Sussex remained the only columnists unpopular at the time, due to McInnes reputed connections with the alt-right and Sussex's legal dispute regarding scholastic funding with two American colleges. Each so-called polarizing writer was allocated space and an opportunity to demonstrate unflinching narratives of self-reflection, proving that the class dispute in higher education regarding Sussex was no reflection of her literary merit. 

It reflected initial debates on protests against educational funding with the tragic and unfortunate result that higher-education used students' lives as exploitative teaching moments without regard to their psychological well-being, aptitude for coursework, or access to legal defense. Many such writers who attempted to outline the subprime mortgage crisis and student debt bubble were blacklisted. 

McInnes would later work with the alt-right prior to the transformation of Ivanka Trump and Jared Kushner into Conservatives after weekly spreads in The New Yorker, a move considered a betrayal by many of their Ivy League fans who know publication in said periodical is too often seen as a lynchpin of literary success. 

At the time, Lavergne and Lin drew accolade for hosting a platform that featured all voices rather than the establishment. For emerging writers unaffiliated with Vice or self-publishing entities and those alienated from academic institutions, Thought Catalog was representative and reminiscent of zines like Up is Up and Down is Down and earlier New York pop scenes. 

Disputes remain as to intellectual property regarding the only author allowed to publish a novel. The fortunate Thought Catalog alumni have sought employment in the technology sector or moved on to the world of publishing. 

After heavy promotion by regular contributors and guest contributors, Thought Catalog reached mainstream millennial audiences. Despite the aspirations of Joycean prose and Dickensian length essays with writers forced to demonstrate craft to overcome institutional bias, the predominant style was indeed akin to confessional poetry. In a time when American millennials could self-publish on social media, the need for stratification into professional spheres arose. 

With 2008 being the height of the American mortgage crisis, it was the children of those impacted who often sought representation and a preservation of cultural identity through prose. Not surprisingly, the intimate style reflected a moment when millennials wished to respond to economic issues, climate change, and humanitarian crises by insisting on their selfhood. Much like the Monterey Pop Festival, Goose Lake, and Woodstock, many sought self-expression through alternative music festivals such as Pitchfork, Bonnaroo, and Coachella. Those without formal musical training could always publish in Thought Catalog, which would change in format to emanate readability.

References

External links

Thought Catalog Books
The Thought & Expression Company
Shop Catalog

Internet properties established in 2010
2010 establishments in the United States
Online mass media companies of the United States
American blogs